The Treaty of Good-Neighborliness and Friendly Cooperation Between the People's Republic of China and the Russian Federation (FCT) is a twenty-year strategic treaty that was signed by the leaders of the two international powers, Jiang Zemin and Vladimir Putin, on July 16, 2001.

On June 28, 2021, Russia and China extended the treaty for another 5 years after its expiration in February 2022.

Overview
The treaty outlines the broad strokes which are to serve as a basis for peaceful relations, economic cooperation, as well as diplomatic and geopolitical reliance. Article 9 of the treaty states "When a situation arises in which one of the contracting parties deems that peace is being threatened and undermined or its security interests are involved or when it is confronted with the threat of aggression, the contracting parties shall immediately hold contacts and consultations in order to eliminate such threats." Other articles (A7 and A16) point at increasing military cooperation, including the sharing of "military know-how" (A16), namely, Chinese access to Russian military technology.

The treaty also encompasses a mutual, cooperative approach to environmental technology regulations and energy conservation; and toward international finance and trade. The document affirms Russia's stand on Taiwan as "an inalienable part of China" (A5), and highlights the commitment to ensure the "national unity and territorial integrity" in the two countries (A4). The treaty includes a no first use clause for the two nations against each other.

According to Paul Stronski and Nicole Ng of the Carnegie Endowment for International Peace, "the greatest threat to the West of the Sino-Russian partnership emanates from their efforts to adjust the international system to their advantage".

Motives

Analysts have attributed the motives behind, and perceived mutual benefit of, the FCT to several factors.

China

 China wishes to develop and modernize its armed forces, much of which remain outdated. This process can be accelerated with Russian military training and technology.
 China wants to obtain a stable, consistent and affordable level of fuel shipments, especially petroleum. This goal can be better met with purchases and delivery of Russian oil, including the construction of an Eastern Siberia–Pacific Ocean oil pipeline.
 China wishes to attain support for its stance towards Taiwan.

Russia

 Russia strives to obtain sources of capital, which it is in need of following severe losses to international speculators during the process of Soviet dissolution. This effort can be significantly aided through the use of Chinese capital. Accordingly:
 Russia wants to find sources of employment for its skilled workforce.
 Russia wants to sell its military technology and expertise.
 Russia wants to sell its large reserves of petroleum and natural gas.
 Russia receives an assurance that the expansion of Chinese economic influence in the post-Soviet space does not oppose Russian political influence.

Economic competition with the US, Japan and the EU

The United States, Japan and the European Union are three economic powers who possess a skilled workforce and access to capital. Russia and the PRC can more effectively compete against these powers in the world economy, with Russia given access to Chinese capital and China given access to Russian training and technology.

See also
 BRIC
 Foreign relations of the People's Republic of China
 Foreign relations of the Russian Federation
 Sino-Russian relations
 Military alliance
 List of military alliances

References

External links
Text of the Treaty — Ministry of Foreign Affairs of the People's Republic of China

Treaties of the People's Republic of China
Sino-Russian
China–Russia treaties
Treaties concluded in 2001